Moshkovo is the name of several inhabited localities (work settlements and villages) in Russia.

Urban localities
Moshkovo, Novosibirsk Oblast, a work settlement in Moshkovsky District of Novosibirsk Oblast

Rural localities
Moshkovo, Ivanovo Oblast, a village in Verkhnelandekhovsky District of Ivanovo Oblast
Moshkovo, Leningrad Oblast, a village in Shugozerskoye Settlement Municipal Formation of Tikhvinsky District of Leningrad Oblast
Moshkovo, Nizhny Novgorod Oblast, a village in Varezhsky Selsoviet of Pavlovsky District of Nizhny Novgorod Oblast
Moshkovo, Perm Krai, a village in Sivinsky District of Perm Krai
Moshkovo, Pskov Oblast, a village in Novosokolnichesky District of Pskov Oblast
Moshkovo, Spirovsky District, Tver Oblast, a village in Spirovsky District, Tver Oblast
Moshkovo, Vyshnevolotsky District, Tver Oblast, a village in Vyshnevolotsky District, Tver Oblast
Moshkovo, Danilovsky District, Yaroslavl Oblast, a village in Slobodskoy Rural Okrug of Danilovsky District of Yaroslavl Oblast
Moshkovo, Rybinsky District, Yaroslavl Oblast, a village in Shashkovsky Rural Okrug of Rybinsky District of Yaroslavl Oblast